The Canadian federal budget for fiscal year 1999-2000 was presented by Minister of Finance Paul Martin in the House of Commons of Canada on 16 February 1999.

External links 

 Budget Speech
 Budget Plan
 Budget in Brief

References

Canadian budgets
1999 in Canadian law
1999 government budgets
1999 in Canadian politics